The WTA Knokke-Heist, also known by its sponsored name Sanex Trophy,  was a women's tennis tournament played on outdoor clay courts in Knokke-Heist, Belgium. As a Tier IVa and Tier IV category event it was part of the WTA Tour. The last edition of the tournament was held in Brussels and named French Community Championships.

Past finals

Singles

Doubles

See also
 Belgian Open – women's tournament (1987–2001)

References